Ean Elliot Clevenger (also known as Ean Elliot) is a multi-instrumentalist, vocalist, and songwriter best known as the former singer and songwriter for A-F Record's political hardcore-punk band Pipedown. Prior to the formation of Pipedown, Clevenger was a vocalist and bassist for the Sublime Records band Silage. He has participated in several North American, European, and Van's Warped Tours with many of his bands including: Pipedown, Silage, Dance For Destruction, NMBRSTTN, and Cruex Lies. He has provided guest vocals on Anti-Flag's albums For Blood and Empire and A Benefit for Victims of Violent Crime. He is known for the strongly voiced left-leaning political lyrics and imagery within his music.

Since the break up of Pipedown in 2005, Ean has been working with several other acts. In 2009, as reported by Punknews.org, his band Dance For Destruction released its first full-length on Lorelei Record's.

In 2011, Ean joined the Canadian band Crashscene, featuring members of Bodog Music's Neurosonic and Lava/Atlantic artist Bif Naked.  The band disbanded with the passing of singer-songwriter Jacen Ekstrom.

Since 2016, Clevenger has been working with his latest band, Creux Lies based out of Sacramento, California.  Creux Lies was recently signed to the seminal post-punk label – Cleopatra Records.  Meanwhile, he continues working on producing various EDM based material and lending his voice to other acts. Clevenger also is pursuing a teaching career in the Sacramento area, briefly having taught at the prestigious Folsom High School alongside Mark Hallam.

References

American punk rock musicians
Living people
Year of birth missing (living people)